Hope Historic District may refer to:

Hope Historic District (Hope, Alaska), listed on the National Register of Historic Places in Kenai Peninsula Borough, Alaska
Hope Historic District (Hope, Indiana), listed on the National Register of Historic Places in Bartholomew County, Indiana